The Miami–Virginia Tech football rivalry is an American college football rivalry between the Miami Hurricanes of the University of Miami and Virginia Tech Hokies of Virginia Tech. As of 2022, Miami leads the series 24–15.

The last game between the two teams was October 15, 2022 in Blacksburg, and Miami won 20–14.

History

First meeting
The Hurricanes and Hokies first met on November 13, 1953, in Miami.

Bowl games
Miami and Virginia Tech have met in two bowl games, and Miami has won both of them, winning the 1966 Liberty Bowl 14–7 and the 1981 Peach Bowl 20–10.

Annual meetings since 1992
The two teams have played annually since 1992. The rivalry began developing when the Hokies became a member of the Big East Conference for football in 1991. When the Atlantic Coast Conference (ACC) expanded in 2004, both Miami and Virginia Tech left the Big East for the ACC. Both teams continue to compete annually as members of the ACC Coastal Division.

The series was largely dominated by Miami until 1995 when Virginia Tech won their first game against Miami in Blacksburg. Since then, the series has been largely even with Virginia Tech winning 15 games and Miami winning 12. Several of the games since 1985 have been notable, including 11 meetings when both teams were ranked in the top 25 and four meetings when both ranked in the top 10.

In 2000, No. 2 Virginia Tech lost to No. 3 Miami at the Miami Orange Bowl 41–21.

In 2003, No. 10 Virginia Tech beat No. 2 Miami in Lane Stadium 31–7, which snapped Miami's long-standing regular season winning streak.

In 2004, the first year for both schools in the ACC, both teams met at the Orange Bowl in Miami for the final game of the regular season, which became a de facto ACC championship game with the winner getting a berth in a Bowl Championship Series bowl game. No. 10 Virginia Tech beat No. 9 Miami 16–10 in that game.

In 2005, No. 5 Miami beat No. 3 Virginia Tech in Blacksburg 27–7.

In 2017, which was the last game that featured both teams meeting while both were ranked, #10 Miami beat #13 Virginia Tech 28 to 10.

In the last ten games, Miami has seven wins to Virginia Tech's three wins. In the last five games, Miami has won four to Virginia Tech's one.

Game results

See also  
 List of NCAA college football rivalry games

References

College football rivalries in the United States
Miami Hurricanes football
Virginia Tech Hokies football